A by-election was held for the New South Wales Legislative Assembly electorate of Oxley on 21 February 1981 following the resignation of Bruce Cowan to successfully contest the federal seat of Lyne at the 1980 election.

By-elections for the seats of Cessnock, Maitland and Sturt were held on the same day.

Dates

Results

Bruce Cowan resigned to successfully contest the seat of contested the federal seat of Lyne.

Aftermath
Peter King's career was to be short-lived. The electoral redistribution for the 1981 state election abolished the nearby electorate of Raleigh, and its Country Party MLA, Jim Brown, chose to challenge King for Oxley preselection rather than contest the new electorate of Coffs Harbour. Brown emerged successful after a controversial preselection campaign, and King was forced to retire at the 1981 election.

See also
Electoral results for the district of Oxley
List of New South Wales state by-elections

References

1981 elections in Australia
New South Wales state by-elections
1980s in New South Wales